Halopseudomonas pertucinogena is a Gram-negative, rod-shaped, motile bacterium. It derives its name from the fact that it produces pertucin, a bacteriocin active against phase I organisms of Bordetella pertussis. H. pertucinogena was originally assigned to the genus Pseudomonas, but was later assigned to Halopseudomonas.

References

External links
Type strain of Halopseudomonas pertucinogena at BacDive -  the Bacterial Diversity Metadatabase

Pseudomonadales
Bacteria described in 1975